Elvīra Anatoļjevna Ozoliņa (born 8 October 1939) is a retired Soviet javelin thrower. In 1960 she won gold medal with an Olympic Record of 55.98 m and was awarded the Order of the Red Banner of Labour. Between 1960 and 1963 she set three world records. In 1964 she became the first woman to surpass 60 m (61.38 m, at Soviet Championships), but this result was not ratified as a world record by IAAF. In the 1964 Olympic final she fouled her last four attempts and finished in a disappointing fifth place. Domestically she won the national title in 1959, 1961–62, 1964, 1966, and 1973.

In 1969 Ozoliņa married Jānis Lūsis (1939-2020), the 1968 Olympic champion in men's javelin throw. Their son, Voldemārs Lūsis, competed in the same event at the 2000 and 2004 Olympics.

References

1939 births
Living people
Athletes from Saint Petersburg
Olympic athletes of the Soviet Union
Olympic gold medalists for the Soviet Union
Athletes (track and field) at the 1960 Summer Olympics
Athletes (track and field) at the 1964 Summer Olympics
Soviet female javelin throwers
Burevestnik (sports society) athletes
European Athletics Championships medalists
Medalists at the 1960 Summer Olympics
Olympic gold medalists in athletics (track and field)
Universiade medalists in athletics (track and field)
Universiade gold medalists for the Soviet Union
Medalists at the 1959 Summer Universiade
Medalists at the 1963 Summer Universiade
Latvian people of Russian descent